Trachypepla ingenua is a moth of the family Oecophoridae first described by Edward Meyrick in 1911. It is endemic to New Zealand and has been collected in both the North and South Islands. This species is one of the larger in the genus Trachypepla and the colouration of the adults imitates bird droppings. The preferred habitat of T. ingenua is native forest and adults are on the wing from December to February.

Taxonomy 
This species was first described by Edward Meyrick in 1911 using a specimen collected by George Hudson at Ōtira River in December. The male genitalia of this species was studied and illustrated by Alfred Philpott in 1927. In 1928 Hudson discussed and illustrated this species in his 1928 book The butterflies and moths of New Zealand. The male holotype is held at the Natural History Museum, London.

Description

Meyrick described this species as follows:

This species is one of the larger moths in the Trachypepla genus and its colouring imitates the droppings of birds. This species can be distinguished from its close relative T. semilauta as it lacks the white patch on the basal portion of the forewings that is present in the latter species.

Distribution 

This species is endemic to New Zealand and has been found in both the North and the South Islands. As well as at the type locality, this species has also been collected at Mount Arthur at an altitude of approximately 1050 m, at Arthur's Pass, at Aoraki / Mount Cook, on the Milford Track, on the Clinton River and near the Homer tunnel.

Habitat 
The preferred habitat of this species is native forest.

Behaviour 
Adults of this species are on the wing from December to February.

References 

Moths described in 1911
Oecophoridae
Taxa named by Edward Meyrick
Moths of New Zealand
Endemic fauna of New Zealand
Endemic moths of New Zealand